"Open Your Mind" is a song by Italian electronic music group U.S.U.R.A., released as the debut single and title track from the group's only album, Open Your Mind (1993). Released in 1993 through Italian Style in Italy and through Deconstruction Records across the rest of Europe and Australia, it samples the song "New Gold Dream (81–82–83–84)" by Scottish band Simple Minds and directly samples the titular line of dialogue spoken by the mutant Kuato in the 1990 film Total Recall.

Following a period of underground popularity, "Open Your Mind" became a mainstream hit in early 1993, reaching the top five in Austria, Belgium, Finland, Italy, the Netherlands, and Switzerland, and the top ten in Ireland, the UK, and Germany. A 1997 remix by DJ Quicksilver failed to replicate the success of the original.

Critical reception
Larry Flick of Billboard magazine called the track a "fast'n'furious romp, overflowing with stately strings, shoulder-shaking percussion, and more than a few imaginative vocal samples", citing the song's melody as the most productive component. In a later review, Flick doubted the song's commercial potential because of the lack of additional remixes, but he went on the write that "Open Your Mind" was "strong enough to merit a recurrent spin or two". On the 1997 release, he described it as a "disco-splashed twirler that is light on lyrics (think "open your mind" over and over and over) but heavy on rubbery rhythms and keyboard loops that permanently stick to the brain upon impact." He added, "Not likely to be a long-lasting entry but certainly a memorable one." 

James Masterton wrote in his weekly UK chart commentary, "Just to show that nothing is ever what it seems, even at a time when hardcore dance is losing its chart edge, a rave track can come from nowhere into the 10." A reviewer from Music & Media magazine described the song as having a "pace worth keeping up" and characterised it as a "stomper". Chris Finan from Music Weeks RM Dance Update gave the 1997 remix four out of five, adding, "More cosmetic covering of the original without too much playing around has resulted in a definite commercial ciub-friendly track with the all-important crossover potential." Joe Muggs of Fact listed the track in his 2014 list of "35 stunners from back when progressive house wasn't terrible", calling it "Crass but brilliant – as is the none-more-nineties video".

Music video
A music video was produced to promote the single. It features images of Joe McCarthy, Benito Mussolini, Richard Nixon, Ian Paisley, Ronald Reagan, Josef Stalin, Margaret Thatcher and Mary Whitehouse.

Track listings
"Open Your Mind"
 Australian CD and maxi-CD single "Open Your Mind" (Restricted Mix edit) – 3:40
 "Open Your Mind" (classic mix) – 5:16
 "Open Your Mind" (Fishpop Mix) – 5:14
 "Open Your Mind" (Tatata Mix) – 5:18

"Open Your Mind '97"
 European maxi-CD "Open Your Mind '97" (DJ Quicksilver radio edit) – 3:02
 "Open Your Mind '97" (original radio cut) – 3:01
 "Open Your Mind '97" (DJ Quicksilver Remix) – 6:07
 "Open Your Mind '97" (De Donatis Remix) – 7:45

 Australian maxi-CD'
 "Open Your Mind '97" (DJ Quicksilver radio mix) – 3:57
 "Open Your Mind '97" (original radio cut) – 3:01
 "Open Your Mind '97" (T.S. Triponphunky Remix) – 6:53
 "Open Your Mind '97" (De Donatis Remix) – 7:46
 "Open Your Mind '97" (M.U.T.E. Remix) – 4:50
 "Open Your Mind" (original classic mix) – 5:18

Charts

Weekly charts

Year-end charts

References

1992 songs
1993 singles
1997 singles
Animated music videos
Deconstruction Records singles
Songs written by Charlie Burchill
Songs written by Derek Forbes
Songs written by Jim Kerr
Techno songs
UK Independent Singles Chart number-one singles